Darren Jack Dalton (born February 9, 1965) is an American actor, screenwriter, and film producer. He is best known for playing Randy the Soc in The Outsiders (1983) and Daryl in Red Dawn (1984),

Life and career
Dalton was born in Powell, Wyoming. Dalton's career began in 1982 when cast as Randy Anderson by Francis Ford Coppola during a nationwide talent search for the teen ensemble The Outsiders.

After The Outsiders, Dalton appeared with C. Thomas Howell and Patrick Swayze in Red Dawn (1984), a story of a group of teenagers fighting Soviet Union troops who had invaded the United States. Dalton portrayed Daryl Bates, the son of the mayor.

After Red Dawn, Dalton's first made-for-television movie was Brotherhood of Justice (1986) as a rebellious teenager, and he appeared in the short-lived TV ensemble drama The Best Times (1985). He also had TV guest appearances in the late 1980s on Highway to Heaven, Quantum Leap, Alien Nation and as General Custer on Doctor Quinn, Medicine Woman. Shortly after, he returned to film, including in Dancing in the Forest (1989) and The Wolves (1996).

Turning to screenwriting full-time, Dalton did not appear in other TV shows or movies until 2007's The Stolen Moments of September. He then returned to acting in War of the Worlds 2, Children of the Hunt, Darkroom (which he also executive produced and provided music for), the 3-D zombie thriller Day of the Living and The Day the Earth Stopped which Dalton also wrote and produced, and The Land That Time Forgot, which Dalton adapted from the Edgar Rice Burroughs novel.

Filmography

References

External links
 
 http://darrenjdalton.com/

1965 births
Living people
American male film actors
American male screenwriters
American film producers
Male actors from Wyoming
20th-century American male actors
21st-century American male actors
Screenwriters from Wyoming
People from Powell, Wyoming